Orange Unified School District (OUSD) is a public school district headquartered in Orange, California.

Orange USD serves the cities of Orange and Villa Park, the unincorporated land of Silverado, and parts of Anaheim, Garden Grove, Santa Ana, and an unpopulated area of Yorba Linda. Its student enrollment during the 2004–2005 school year was 31,600.

History

The Orange Unified School District was formed in 1953, when citizens in the City of Orange voted to form a school district, which combined five elementary districts with one high school district.

In 2003, Orange USD gave territory to the Tustin Unified School District.

District Schools
The district operates 29 elementary, 5 middle, 4 high schools, a continuation high school, a K-8 math and science magnet school and two special schools. Nineteen of its forty-two schools have been recognized as California Distinguished Schools. Three of its high schools are consistently listed among Newsweek's 1,000 Best Public High Schools in America.

Some elementary and middle schools within the district also continue to achieve above average standardized test scores and national distinctions, while others are state designated Underperforming Schools under the No Child Left Behind Act's sanctions. Generally, its highest performing schools are in the Anaheim Hills area where all schools have been named California Distinguished Schools and constantly rank among the best schools in the county, while schools in the City of Orange tend to have lower standardized test scores.

High schools

Canyon High School
El Modena High School
Orange High School
Villa Park High School

Middle schools

 Cerro Villa Middle School
 El Rancho Charter School
 Portola Middle School
 Santiago Prep Charter Academy
 Yorba Middle School
 McPherson Magnet School

Elementary schools

Anaheim Hills Elementary School
California Elementary School
Crescent Elementary
Cambridge Elementary School
Canyon Rim Elementary School
Chapman Hills Elementary School
Crescent (formerly Peralta) Intermediate School
Crescent Primary School
Esplanade Elementary School
Fairhaven Elementary School
Fletcher Elementary School
Handy Elementary School
Imperial Elementary School
Jordan Elementary School
La Veta Elementary School
Lampson Elementary School
Linda Vista Elementary School
McPherson Magnet School
Nohl Canyon Elementary School
Olive Elementary School
Palmyra Elementary School
Panorama Elementary School
Prospect Elementary School
Running Springs Elementary School
Serrano Elementary School
Sycamore Elementary School
Taft Elementary School
Villa Park Elementary School
West Orange Elementary School

Special schools
Canyon Hills School
Parkside School
Richland High School

Board of Education
Trustee Area 1 Andrea Yamasaki
Trustee Area 2 John Ortega, Vice President
Trustee Area 3 Ana Page
Trustee Area 4 Madison-Klovstad Miner
Trustee Area 5 Kristen Erickson
Trustee Area 6 Angie Rumsey, Clerk
Trustee Area 7 Rick Ledesma, President

Gay-Straight Alliance (Colin ex rel. Colin v. Orange Unified School District)
In 1999, the Orange Unified School District voted unanimously to prohibit the formation of a Gay-Straight Alliance at El Modena High School. The students sued the school board, claiming that their rights under the First Amendment and the 1984 Equal Access Act had been violated. In the first-ever ruling of its kind, Judge David O. Carter of the United States District Court for the Central District of California issued a preliminary injunction ordering the school to allow the GSA to meet. After a settlement was agreed upon, the students were allowed to meet and were given access to school resources equal to all other campus clubs.

References

External links

 

School districts in Orange County, California
School District
Education in Anaheim, California
1953 establishments in California
School districts established in 1953